A legislative consent motion (LCM, also known as a Sewel motion in Scotland) is a motion passed by either the Scottish Parliament, Senedd, or Northern Ireland Assembly, in which it consents that the Parliament of the United Kingdom may (or may not) pass legislation on a devolved issue over which the devolved government has regular legislative authority.

, the three devolved governments have refused or partially refused legislative consent motions on 20 occasions. However, even if consent is refused, the Parliament of the United Kingdom may still pass legislation on the devolved issue in question under the doctrine of parliamentary sovereignty and the understanding that the United Kingdom is a unitary state.

Background
The Scotland Act 1998 devolved many issues relating to legislation for Scotland to the Scottish Parliament.  The UK Parliament maintains parliamentary sovereignty and may legislate on any issue, with or without the permission of the devolved assemblies and parliaments.

The motions were named after Lord Sewel, then Parliamentary Under-Secretary of State for Scotland who announced the policy in the House of Lords during the passage of the Scotland Act 1998. Noting that the Act recognised the Parliamentary sovereignty of the British Parliament, he said that HM Government "would expect a convention to be established that Westminster would not normally legislate with regard to devolved matters in Scotland without the consent of the Scottish Parliament".

The devolved governments have no formal say in how the British Parliament legislates on reserved matters.

Use and application
There are two uses for a legislative consent motion, taking Scotland as the example:

 When the UK Parliament is considering legislation extending only (or having provisions extending only) to England and Wales, and the Scottish Parliament, being in agreement with those provisions, wishes for the UK Parliament to extend them to Scotland.  This saves the need for separate, similar legislation to be passed by the Scottish Parliament.
 When Westminster is considering legislation applying to Scotland but which relates to both devolved and reserved matters, where it would otherwise be necessary for the Scottish Parliament to legislate to complete the jigsaw.

As well as legislation about devolved matters, the convention extends to cases where UK bills give executive powers to Scottish Ministers, including in reserved areas, or which seek to change the boundary between reserved and devolved matters.

Guidance on the use of legislative consent motions for Whitehall departments is set out in Devolution Guidance Note 10.

Chapter 9B of the Scottish Parliament's Standing Orders specify the procedure for considering Sewel motions.

Legal status

The convention under which the UK government uses legislative consent motions is not legally binding. It was originally contained in a "memorandum of understanding" between the UK government and the devolved administrations. That document states in an explanatory note that it is not intended to be legally binding, and the paragraph dealing with the convention makes clear that the UK Parliament retains authority to legislate on any issue, whether devolved or not.

Since then, however, the convention has been incorporated into law in both Scotland and Wales. However, despite this inclusion, the statements are not legally binding on the UK Parliament.

Scotland Act 2016
In 2016 the UK Parliament passed the Scotland Act 2016 which amended the Scotland Act 1998 to contain an explicit and specific legal reference to the so-called Sewel convention. Section 2 of the 2016 Act reads as follows:

Wales Act 2017
In 2017 the UK Parliament passed the Wales Act 2017 which amended the Government of Wales Act 2006 to contain an explicit and specific legal reference to Westminster legislation on matters that are devolved to the Welsh Assembly. Section 2 of the 2017 Act reads as follows:

Current situation and review

In 2005 the Procedures Committee undertook an inquiry into the use of Sewel motions, and heard evidence from Lord Sewel, Henry McLeish (the former First Minister of Scotland), and Anne McGuire, MP (the Parliamentary Under-Secretary of State for Scotland). Following the review, the motions were retitled legislative consent motions and the procedures enshrined in the parliament's standing orders.

, 131 legislative consent motions had been passed by the Scottish Parliament, 39 in the first session (1999–2003), 38 in the second (2003–2007), 30 in the third (2007–11) and 24 so far in the fourth (2011–16).

List of refused legislative consent motions

See also
 Neil MacCormick, who has argued that parliamentary sovereignty is an "exclusively English doctrine".

References

External links
 Devolution Guidance Note 10 (pdf).
 Chapter 9b of the Scottish Parliament's standing orders
 Scottish Government information on Sewel convention.
 Scottish Parliament information on Legislative Consent Motions
 BBC Open Secrets blog – Devolution tensions exposed
Cowie, Graham. 2018. Brexit: Devolution and legislative consent. House of Commons Library.

Government of Scotland
Scottish Parliament
Constitutional conventions of the United Kingdom